Serra de Santana is a microregion in the Brazilian state of Rio Grande do Norte.

Municipalities 
The microregion consists of the following municipalities:
 Bodó
 Cerro Corá
 Florânia
 Lagoa Nova
 Santana do Matos
 São Vicente
 Tenente Laurentino Cruz

References

Microregions of Rio Grande do Norte